Puneeth Rajkumar was an Indian actor known for his work in Kannada films. As a six-month-old infant, he made a cameo appearance in V. Somashekar's Premada Kanike (1976) and followed it with Sanaadi Appanna (1977) when he was a year old. Most of his earlier films had his father Rajkumar playing his reel father as well. Films like Thayige Thakka Maga, Vasantha Geetha and Bhagyavantha followed up which also showcased his singing skills. For the N. Lakshminarayan film Bettada Hoovu he was awarded the National Film Award for Best Child Artist. He ended his childhood appearances with the action film Parashuram.

Puneeth's first leading role came opposite Rakshita in Appu (2002), a highly successful romantic drama directed by Puri Jagannadh. This was followed by Abhi opposite Ramya in 2003, and Veera Kannadiga and Maurya in 2004. All these films were commercially successful and established him as one of the leading actors in Kannada cinema. He was known for his versatile stunts, especially his backflips. His superhuman flexibility was attributed by some to his Idiga background, who were agile toddy tappers.

Puneeth's first award-winning performance came through the film Arasu for which he won the Filmfare award and his next release Milana got him the Karnataka State Film Award. His other major successes include Jackie, Hudugaru, Rana Vikrama, Raajakumara and ''Natasaarvabhowma, Yuvarathnaa.

Film

As actor

Voice roles

As producer

Television

References

External links
 

Indian filmographies
Male actor filmographies